Daniel Kerschbaumer (born 11 June 1989) is an Austrian footballer who plays for Union Weißkirchen.

Career
In January 2020, Kerschbaumer joined OÖ Liga club ASKÖ Oedt.

Honours
Pasching
Austrian Cup: 2012–13

References

External links
 
 

Austrian footballers
Association football defenders
FK Austria Wien players
SV Ried players
FC Blau-Weiß Linz players
LASK players
FC Juniors OÖ players
FC Kärnten players
SK Vorwärts Steyr players
SK Austria Klagenfurt players
SV Mattersburg players
Austrian Football Bundesliga players
2. Liga (Austria) players
Austrian Regionalliga players
1989 births
Living people